Robert Francis Byrnes (30 December 1917, Waterville, New York – 19 June 1997, Ocean Isle, North Carolina) was an American professor of history, specializing in Russian history and Kremlinology.

Life 
Byrnes graduated from Amherst College in 1939. He became a graduate student at Harvard University in 1939, where he took a survey course in Russian history from Michael Karpovich and studied basic Russian under Samuel H. Cross (1891–1946). In 1943 Byrnes became a civilian employee of the military intelligence services, specializing in intelligence for the American bombing campaign against the Japanese electronics industry. In 1945 he was appointed to a one-year academic position at Swarthmore College, with an opportunity to teach Russian. He received a PhD in French history at Harvard University in 1947. In 1947 he joined the faculty of Rutgers University, where he taught European and Russian history. On a leave of absence from Rutgers, he spent two years from 1948 to 1950 as a senior postdoctoral fellow at Columbia University's new Russian Institute. In 1950 he returned to teaching at Rutgers University, but in 1951 he took another leave of absence to work as a researcher for the Office of National Estimates organized by William L. Langer under the auspices of the newly established Central Intelligence Agency (CIA). For the academic year 1950–1951 Byrnes was at the Institute for Advanced Study. From 1951 to 1954 he worked for the CIA. He was a Guggenheim Fellow for the academic year 1951–1952. From 1954 to 1956 he was the director of a CIA-funded think tank on Soviet issues.

He was the author, editor, or co-editor of approximately 20 books. He was the author or coauthor of over 100 articles or book chapters. He was a member of the board of Radio Free Europe and Radio Liberty, a trustee of Boston College, a senior fellow at Georgetown University's Center for Strategic and International Studies, and a research fellow at Stanford University's Hoover Institute.

In 1942 Byrnes married Eleanor F. Jewell (1918–2019). Upon his death he was survived by his widow, seven children, and seventeen grandchildren.

Selected publications

References

1917 births
1997 deaths
Amherst College alumni
Indiana University faculty
Historians of Russia
20th-century American historians
American Roman Catholics
People of the Central Intelligence Agency
People from Waterville, New York
Rutgers University faculty
Swarthmore College faculty
Harvard Graduate School of Arts and Sciences alumni